The 1990 Cork Senior Football Championship was the 102nd staging of the Cork Senior Football Championship since its establishment by the Cork County Board in 1887. The draw for the opening round fixtures took place on 17 December 1989. The championship began on 20 April 1990 and ended on 4 November 1990.

Castlehaven entered the championship as the defending champions, however, they were defeated by Muskerry in the second round.

On 4 November 1990, Duhallow won the championship following an 0-08 to 0-06 defeat of St. Finbarr's in the final. This was their second championship title overall and their first title since 1936.

Colm O'Neill and Dave Barry were the championship's joint top scorers with 0-21.

Team changes

To Championship

Promoted from the Cork Intermediate Football Championship
 Rockchapel

Results

First round

Second round

Quarter-finals

Semi-finals

Final

Championship statistics

Top scorers

Top scorers overall

Top scorers in a single game

Miscellaneous

 On 22 April 1990, Carrigdhoun recorded their first championship victory since 1968.
 Duhallow,then Duhallow West, win the title for the first time since 1936. The gap of 54 years was the longest gap between titles at the time.

References

Cork Senior Football Championship